The 1967–68 Houston Mavericks season was the first season of the Mavericks in the American Basketball Association. On February 2, 1967, Houston was awarded a franchise for $30,000 with William Whitmore, Charles Frazier and Cloyce Box being the buyers. Later that year, T.S. Morrow and Bud Adams, owner of a Houston-based oil company and the AFL's Houston Oilers bought Box's interest in the team. Morrow would be majority owner while Adams was a minority owner. The team had less than stellar attendance, with 3,091 attending the first ever game versus the Chaparrals on October 23, 1967 (losing 100–83). The lowest attended game was held on February 5, 1968, when only 575 people attended. The highest attended game was on February 29, 1968, with 4,965 attendance. Despite all of this, the Mavericks spiraled into the playoffs, in part due to 8 of the 11 teams in the new league being guaranteed a spot into the Playoffs, with Houston getting the final spot by 4 games. In the Semifinals, they were swept by the Dallas Chaparrals in 3 games. This was their only playoff appearance in their two-year history.

Roster
 34 Art Becker - Power forward
 24 Wilbert Frazier - Power forward 
 20 Hal Hale - Point guard
 22 Joe Hamood - Shooting guard
 44 Darrell Hardy - Forward
 35 Leary Lentz - Small forward
 31 Guy Manning - Small forward
 14 DeWitt Menyard - Center
 44 Wayne Molis - Center
 21 Jerry Pettway - Shooting guard
 15 Bob Riedy - Power forward
 25 Roger Schurig - Point guard
 12 Willie Somerset - Point guard
 -- Gary Turner - Forward

Final standings

Western Division

Record vs. opponents

Playoffs
Western Division Semifinals

Mavericks lose series 3–0

Awards and honors
1968 ABA All-Star Game selections (game played on January 9, 1968)
 Art Becker
 DeWitt Menyard

References

 Mavericks on Basketball Reference

External links
 RememberTheABA.com 1967–68 regular season and playoff results
 Houston Mavericks page

Houston Mavericks
Houston
Houston Mavericks, 1967-68
Houston Mavericks, 1967-68